Man Mohan Singh Gujral (1919 — 12 September 2015) was an Indian Judge and the first Chief Justice of the Sikkim High Court

Career
Justice Gujral remained District and Sessions Judge at Ambala, Chandigarh, Shimla and Rohtak. He was also the Legal Remembrancer of joint Punjab. He took charge of the District & Additional Sessions Judge of Andaman and Nicobar Islands in 1965. He was elevated as a Judge of the Punjab and Haryana High Court on 21 August 1969. On 7 May 1976 he was transferred and became the first Chief Justice of the Sikkim High Court. Justice Gujral retired on 15 March 1983. He expired in 2015 at the age 96.

References

1919 births
2015 deaths
Punjabi people
20th-century Indian judges
Judges of the Punjab and Haryana High Court
Chief Justices of the Sikkim High Court
Indian judges